The Saudi Public Transport Company (SAPTCO), is a public owned transport company, which operates urban buses in Riyadh, Jeddah, and Mecca; intercity buses; and international buses to the UAE, Egypt (via ferry connection), Jordan and Bahrain.

Buses are gender-segregated, women and children using a rear door on urban buses for women and children and front seats on intercity buses.

History 
The enterprise was established on 4 February 1979, with the issuance of Royal Decree No. (M / 11)

References

Transport in Saudi Arabia